was a Japanese archaeologist, historian and anthropologist.

He was an expert in the Edo period of the samurai, and was also particularly knowledgeable about Japanese folklore, in which he has been referenced in several publications. From the 1880s he was much involved with the Anthropological Association in Tokyo, publishing a number of works, and was one of the founders of the Ou Anthropological Association in November 1890.

References

Japanese archaeologists
20th-century Japanese historians
Japanese anthropologists
Japanese folklorists
1851 births
1921 deaths
19th-century Japanese historians